Tatyana Krasnova (born 27 June 1995) is a Belarusian footballer who plays as a midfielder for Top Division club Rostov and the Belarus women's national team.

References

1995 births
Living people
Women's association football midfielders
Belarusian women's footballers
Belarus women's international footballers
FC Gomel players
Ryazan-VDV players
Expatriate women's footballers in Russia
Belarusian expatriate sportspeople in Russia
Bobruichanka Bobruisk players